Kim Seon-hak (born 2 March 1973) is a South Korean wrestler. He competed in the men's freestyle 52 kg at the 1992 Summer Olympics.

References

External links
 

1973 births
Living people
South Korean male sport wrestlers
Olympic wrestlers of South Korea
Wrestlers at the 1992 Summer Olympics
Place of birth missing (living people)
20th-century South Korean people